Director's Special may refer to:

Director's Special (whisky), a brand of Indian whisky
Director's Special (film), a 2013 Kannada film